The London Midland and Scottish Railway LMS ex-ROD 2-8-0s were a class of 2-8-0 steam locomotive designed for freight work.

In 1927, the LMS purchased 75 ex-Railway Operating Division ROD 2-8-0s from George Cohen and Armstrong Disposals Corporation, primarily for their tenders, which were used for various ex-LNWR locomotives.  Thirty engines were sold, minus their tenders, to Armstrong Whitworth, who exported most of them to China as Chinese Government Railways KD4.  25 engines were scrapped by the LMS between 1927 and 1930.  The remaining 20 were overhauled and pressed into service as numbers 9646–65 in 1927 and 1928.  Initially given power classification of 5, this was later revised to 7F.  Several were later renumbered but some were withdrawn before they had a chance to receive their allotted numbers.  All were withdrawn between 1929 and 1932 and scrapped.

References

7F
2-8-0 locomotives
Standard gauge steam locomotives of Great Britain
Scrapped locomotives
Freight locomotives